Donald Kinsey (born May 12, 1953 in Gary, Indiana, United States) is an American guitarist and singer, best known as a member of the Word Sound and Power Band, the reggae backing group for Peter Tosh. 

Kinsey is one of three sons of the late Chicago blues performer, Big Daddy Kinsey. He is a member of the Kinsey Report, which he formed in 1984 with his brothers, Ralph Kinsey and Kenneth Kinsey, and Ron Prince. Previously he toured and recorded with Albert King, Peter Tosh, Bob Marley and the Wailers and Roy Buchanan.

Discography

With Albert King 
Live At The Fabulous Forum 1972

Blues At Sunset

Blues At Sunrise

I Wanna Get Funky

Funky London/Live At Wattstax

White Lightning 
White Lightning

With Bob Marley 
Rastaman Vibration

Live At The Roxy

With Burning Spear 
Dry & Heavy

Marcus' Children

With Peter Tosh 
Bush Doctor

Equal Rights

Legalize It

Mama Africa

Captured Live

Live & Dangerous

Live At The One Love Peace Concert

Live At The Jamaican World Music Festival

With Chosen Ones 
Reggae The Night Away 12"

Song For Bob 12"

With Heavy Manners 
Heavier Than Now

With Betty Wright 
Wright Back At You

With Roy Buchanan 
Dancing On The Edge

Hot Wires

With Big Daddy Kinsey 
Bad Situation

Can't Let Go

I Am The Blues

Ramblin' Man

With The Kinsey Report 
Edge Of The City

Midnight Drive

Powerhouse

Crossing Bridges

Smoke & Steel

Standing (I'll Be)

With Denroy Morgan 
Salvation

With Morgan Heritage 
Full Circle

Singles 
Jah Is Calling/Jah Children

Sweet Emotion

References

External links
Kinsey's official website
Kinsey on xtrememusician.com
The Kinsey Report in Blues on Stage

1953 births
Living people
Musicians from Gary, Indiana
American reggae guitarists
American male guitarists
American reggae musicians
The Wailers members
Guitarists from Indiana
20th-century American guitarists